The Bailong Elevator (literally Hundred Dragons Elevator) is a glass double-deck elevator built onto the side of a huge cliff in the Wulingyuan area of Zhangjiajie, People's Republic of China that is  high. It is claimed to be the highest and heaviest outdoor elevator in the world.  Construction of the elevator began in October 1999, and it was opened to the public by 2002. The environmental effects of the elevator have been a subject of debate and controversy, as the Wulingyuan area was designated a World Heritage Site in 2002. Operations were stopped for 10 months in 2002–2003, reportedly due to safety concerns, not environmental ones.

On 15 July 2015, the elevator was officially recognised by Guinness World Records as the world's tallest outdoor elevator.

See also
 Hammetschwand Elevator
 List of towers

References

Individual elevators
Tourist attractions in Zhangjiajie